Piantanida is an Italian surname. Notable people with the surname include:

Giorgio Piantanida (born 1967), Italian alpine skier
Nick Piantanida (1932–1966), American amateur parachute jumper

Italian-language surnames